Naukšēni Manor is a two-story manor house located in the Naukšēni Municipality, Naukšēni Parish, in the historical region of Vidzeme, northern Latvia.

History 
Built in 1820, it was renovated in 1843 by Friedrich Gottlieb Gläser in Empire style according to the drafts made by its landlord Heinrich Wilhelm von Groth. Additional modifications were made at the end of the 19th century and again in 1938. Between 1920 and 1957 the building functioned as a children's home. It now houses the Naukšēni local history museum.

See also
 List of palaces and manor houses in Latvia

References

External links

  Tourism in the Naukšēni municipality
  Naukšēni Manor

Manor houses in Latvia